Hang Dong is a tambon (subdistrict) of Hang Dong District, in Chiang Mai Province, Thailand. In 2016 it had a population of 10,866 people.

Administration

Central administration
The tambon is divided into nine administrative villages (mubans).

Local administration
The area of the subdistrict is shared by two local governments.
 Subdistrict municipality (thesaban tambon) Hang Dong (เทศบาลตำบลหางดง)
 Subdistrict municipality (thesaban tambon) Mae Tha Chang (เทศบาลตำบลแม่ท่าช้าง)

References

External links
Thaitambon.com on Hang Dong 

Tambon of Chiang Mai province
Populated places in Chiang Mai province